David Thaxton (born 12 May 1982) is a Welsh singer, actor and musical theatre and opera performer. He starred in the Donmar Warehouse's Passion, for which he won the 2011 Laurence Olivier Award for Best Actor in a Leading Role in a Musical. He previously starred as The Phantom in The Phantom of the Opera at Her Majesty's Theatre, Enjolras in the West End production of Les Misérables, and in March 2011, he joined the cast of Love Never Dies, undertaking the role of Raoul de Chagny. Later then playing the role of Kevin T in the London production of Come from Away.

Early life and education 
Thaxton was born in Neath, South Wales.  He attended Grimston Primary School and Springwood High School in King's Lynn, Norfolk, and subsequently won a scholarship to the Royal Welsh College of Music and Drama, following a four-year vocal studies course, where he was awarded Young Welsh Musical Theatre Singer of the Year 2005 and was runner-up in the Kathleen Ferrier Young Singers' Bursary. He was also a member of Only Men Aloud!.

Career
As a member of the National Youth Music Theatre, he was part of the world premiere of Richard Taylor's Warchild. He was a soloist at the opening gala for the Wales Millennium Centre in 2004 and created the role of the Wolf in the world premiere of John Doyle's The Tailors Daughter (Welsh National Youth Opera). Other work includes Foreman in Trial by Jury, and the subsequent Chandos recording (BBC National Orchestra of Wales, St David's Hall), Nick Shadow in The Rake's Progress (Wales Millennium Centre), Sweeney in Sweeney Todd (Norwich Playhouse), Harasta in The Cunning Little Vixen (Cardiff Sherman) and Tarquinius in The Rape of Lucretia.

Les Misérables
From 2005 to 2007, Thaxton was an ensemble member in the London production of Les Misérables at the Queen's Theatre, playing the parts of Courfeyrac and Bamatabois, and understudying the roles of Enjolras and the Bishop of Digne (both first cover). He was part of the 21st Anniversary Cast, performing at the special BBC Radio 2 concert.

In 2008, he returned to Les Misérables, now as principal Enjolras. After the cast change in June 2009, he stayed on for the 2009–2010 season as well. He left the show on 19 June 2010, having played the role to much acclaim and attention from the public.

Thaxton played the role of Javert in the 2014–2015 West End production and reprised the role in 2018.

As of September 27th 2022, Thaxton has once again returned to the role of Javert at the Sondheim Theatre in London's West End, opposite Jon Robyns as Jean Valjean.

Passion
In March 2010, Thaxton accepted the offer to play the part of Giorgio in the Donmar Warehouse revival of the Sondheim/Lapine musical Passion alongside Elena Roger and Scarlett Strallen, with previews starting on 10 September 2010 and opening night on 21 September 2010. He won the Olivier Award for Best Actor in a Musical.
Sondheim praised his performance for bringing the show "properly into focus" and making Giorgio the center of attention.

Love Never Dies
Thaxton portrayed Raoul, Vicomte de Chagny in the second cast of Love Never Dies, taking over from Joseph Millson who portrayed Raoul in the original cast. He played this role at the Adelphi Theatre until it closed on 27 August 2011.

Unborn Twin
Thaxton is a member of the band Unborn Twin (formerly Glasgow Coma Score). On 12 January 2012, they announced that they would be issuing their first EP (Distort and Merge EP) and on 12 April of the same year would play a concert at London's Bush Hall. Following on from this the band released the CD and download single "Suffer This", and have played several shows at venues such as Norwich Arts Centre, 93 Feet East and the Dublin Castle in Camden.

Candide
From 23 November to 22 February 2013, Thaxton portrayed Maximilian in Candide at the Menier Chocolate Factory, alongside Fra Fee and Scarlett Strallen.

Theatre credits

Accolades

See also
 List of British actors

References

External links
 Official Les Misérables Website
 Unofficial West End Les Misérables Website
 Unborn Twin Website 

1982 births
Living people
People from Neath
21st-century Welsh male opera singers
Welsh male musical theatre actors
Laurence Olivier Award winners
21st-century Welsh male actors